Concept art is a form of visual art used to convey an idea for use in films, video games, animation, comic books, or other media before it is put into the final product. Concept art usually refers to world-building artwork used to inspire the development of media products, and is not the same as visual development art, though they are often confused.

Concept art is developed through several iterations. Multiple solutions are explored before settling on the final design. Concept art is not only used to develop the work but also to show the project's progress to directors, clients, and investors. Once the development of the work is complete, concept art may be reworked and used for advertising materials.

History 
The term "concept art" was used by the Walt Disney Animation Studios as early as the 1930s. A concept artist is an individual who generates a visual design for an item, character, or area that does not yet exist. This includes, but is not limited to, film, animation, and more recently, video game production. Being a concept artist takes commitment, vision, and a clear understanding of the role.

While it is necessary to have the skills of a fine artist, a concept artist must also be able to work under strict deadlines in the capacity of a graphic designer. Some concept artists may start as fine artists, industrial designers, animators, or even special effects artists. Interpretation of ideas and how they are realized is where the concept artist's individual creativity is most evident, but subject matter is often beyond their control. Many concept artists work in a studio or from home remotely as freelancers. Working for a studio has the advantage of an established salary. The average salary for a concept artist in video games is $60,000-$70,000 a year, although many make much less or more than that.

Materials
Concept art has embraced the use of digital technology. Raster graphics editors for digital painting have become more easily available, as well as hardware such as graphics tablets, enabling more efficient working methods. Prior to this, any number of traditional mediums such as oil paints, acrylic paints, markers and pencils were used. Many modern paint packages are programmed to simulate the blending of color in the same way paint would blend on a canvas; proficiency with traditional media is often paramount to a concept artist's ability to use painting software. Popular programs for concept artists include Photoshop and Corel Painter. Others include Manga Studio, Procreate and ArtRage. Most concept artists have switched to digital media because of ease of editing and speed. A lot of concept work has tight deadlines where a highly polished piece is needed in a short amount of time.

Themes and styles
Concept art has always had to cover many subjects, being the primary medium in film poster design since the early days of Hollywood, but the two most widely covered areas are science fiction and fantasy. Since the recent rise of its use in video game production, concept art has expanded to cover genres from fantasy to realistic depending on the final product.

Concept art ranges from stylized to photorealistic depending on the needs of the project. Artists working on a project often produce a large turnover in the early 'blue sky' stage of production. This provides a broad range of interpretations, most being in the form of sketches, speed paints, and 3D overpaints. Later pieces, such as matte paintings, are produced as realistically as required. Concept artists will often have to adapt to the style of the studio they are hired for. The ability to produce multiple styles is valued in a concept artist.

Specialization
There are many concept art generalists, but there are also many specialized concept artists. The various specializations include, but are not limited to, drafting of characters, as well as creatures, as well as environments, or even industry-related designs. Specialization is regarded as better for freelancers than concept artists who want to work in-house, where flexibility is key. Knowing the foundations of art, such as anatomy, perspective, color theory, design, and lighting are essential to all specializations.

See also
 Key art
 Illustration
 3D modeling
 Architectural rendering
 Artist's impression
 Matte painting
 Storyboard
 Concept car
 Digital painting

References

External links

Illustration
Industrial design